Giuseppe De Santis (11 February 1917 – 16 May 1997) was an Italian film director. One of the most idealistic neorealist filmmakers of the 1940s and 1950s, he wrote and directed films punctuated by ardent cries for social reform. 

He was the brother of Italian cinematographer Pasqualino De Santis. His wife was Gordana Miletic (native spelling: Miletić), a Yugoslav actress and former ballet dancer.

Biography

De Santis was born in Fondi, Lazio. He was a member of the Italian Communist Party (PCI) and fought with the anti-German Resistance in Rome during World War II.

He was first a student of philosophy and literature before entering Rome's Centro Sperimentale di Cinematografia. While working as a journalist for Cinema magazine, De Santis became, under the influence of Cesare Zavattini, a major proponent of the early neorealist filmmakers who were trying to make films that mirrored the simple and tragic realities of proletarian life using location shooting and nonprofessional actors. 

In 1942, De Santis collaborated on the script for Ossessione, Luchino Visconti's debut film, which is usually considered one of the first neo-realist films.  

While still working for Cinema magazine, he increasingly worked as a screenwriter and assistant director until 1947 when he made his own directorial debut with Caccia Tragica (Tragic Hunt). Like the two films to follow, it was a sincere call for better living conditions for the Italian working class and agrarian workers. Issues of corruption, the black market, collaboration with the Germans, and treatment of ex-soldiers were also introduced in the film.

His third film Bitter Rice (1950), the story of a young woman working in the rice fields who must choose between two socially disparate suitors, made a star of Silvana Mangano and was a landmark of the new cinematic style. It also earned De Santis an Academy Award nomination for Best Original Story. 

By the early 1950s, the neorealist movement was falling out of favour with critics and audiences. New filmmakers began using dramatic stories that centered on relationships and de Santis also altered his focus.

In 1952 he filmed Roma ore 11 (Rome 11 o'clock), the first version of the real tragic accident that Augusto Genina remade in 1953 as Three Forbidden Stories.

In 1959 he won a Golden Globe with La strada lunga un anno; the film, produced in Yugoslavia, had a nomination for the Oscar as Best Foreign Language Film.

In 1979 he was a member of the jury at the 11th Moscow International Film Festival. In 1985 he was a member of the jury at the 14th Moscow International Film Festival.

De Santis died in 1997 at the age of 80, in Rome, following a heart attack, and a day of mourning was declared in Italy. A part of his archives have been donated to the Reynolds Library of Wake Forest University.

Also, his wife and friends have established a Foundation named after him.

Filmography
 Desire (1946)
 The Sun Still Rises (1946)
 Tragic Hunt (1947) 
 Bitter Rice (1949) 
 No Peace Under the Olive Tree (1950) 
 Rome 11:00 (1952)
  A Husband for Anna (1953) 
 Days of Love (1954) 
 The Wolves (1956) 
 Engaged to Death (1957)
  The Road a Year Long (1958) 
 La garçonnière (1960) 
 Attack and Retreat (1964) 
  Un apprezzato professionista di sicuro avvenire (1972)

References

External links 

Italian film directors
People from the Province of Latina
1917 births
1997 deaths
Nastro d'Argento winners
Centro Sperimentale di Cinematografia alumni
People of Lazian descent